Elachista punctella is a moth of the family Elachistidae that is endemic to Austria.

References

punctella
Moths described in 1992
Moths of Europe
Endemic fauna of Austria